Fernando Sales de los Cobos (born 12 September 1977) is a Spanish former professional footballer who played as a right midfielder.

Club career
Sales was born in Seville, Andalusia. A product of local Real Betis' youth system, he first appeared professionally with lowly CD Isla Cristina and Levante UD (then in the third division, achieving promotion in his first year).

After making his La Liga debut with Real Valladolid in the 2000–01 season, during a 1–1 away draw against UD Las Palmas, and being an undisputed starter in the following three years scoring a combined total of 15 league goals, Sales transferred to Sevilla FC on a five-year contract, upon Valladolid's 2004 relegation. He appeared sporadically for his new club during his first two campaigns, being restricted to Copa del Rey games in the 2006–07 campaign and not registered at all – alongside teammate Jesuli – in the following season.

On 13 January 2008, Sales moved to RC Celta de Vigo on a free transfer. In September, he signed a one-year deal with another second level side, Hércules CF, being reunited with former Valladolid teammate Tote.

Veteran Sales continued playing in division two in the following years, with Albacete Balompié and AD Alcorcón.

Honours
Sevilla
Copa del Rey: 2006–07
UEFA Cup: 2005–06, 2006–07

References

External links

1977 births
Living people
Footballers from Seville
Spanish footballers
Association football midfielders
La Liga players
Segunda División players
Segunda División B players
Tercera División players
Betis Deportivo Balompié footballers
Levante UD footballers
Real Valladolid players
Sevilla FC players
UEFA Cup winning players
RC Celta de Vigo players
Hércules CF players
Albacete Balompié players
AD Alcorcón footballers
UD San Sebastián de los Reyes players